Statistics of Empress's Cup in the 1989 season.

Overview
It was contested by 16 teams, and Takatsuki FC won the championship.

Results

1st Round
Shimizu FC Ladies 10-0 Toyama Ladies SC
Tokyo Women's College of Physical Education 2-0 Sapporo Habatake
Nissan FC 2-1 Shimizudaihachi SC
Akita FC 0-3 Shinko Seiko FC Clair
Tasaki-Shinju Kobe 3-0 Uwajima Minami High School
Jonan Ladies 0-8 Prima Ham FC Kunoichi
Takatsuki FC 5-0 Seiwa Gakuen SC
Urawa Motobuto 0-7 Yomiuri SC Beleza

Quarterfinals
Shimizu FC Ladies 4-0 Tokyo Women's College of Physical Education
Nissan FC 0-0 (pen 2-3) Shinko Seiko FC Clair
Tasaki-Shinju Kobe 0-0 (pen 3-1) Prima Ham FC Kunoichi
Takatsuki FC 0-0 (pen 2-4) Yomiuri SC Beleza

Semifinals
Shimizu FC Ladies 5-0 Shinko Seiko FC Clair
Tasaki-Shinju Kobe 0-1 Takatsuki FC

Final
Shimizu FC Ladies 0-1 Takatsuki FC
Takatsuki FC won the championship.

References

Empress's Cup
1989 in Japanese women's football